A high-occupancy toll lane (or HOT lane) is a type of traffic lane or roadway that is available to high-occupancy vehicles and other exempt vehicles without charge; other vehicles are required to pay a variable fee that is adjusted in response to demand. Unlike toll roads, drivers have an option to use general purpose lanes, on which a fee is not charged. Express toll lanes, which are less common, operate along similar lines, but do not exempt high-occupancy vehicles.

History
The HOT concept developed from high-occupancy vehicle lane (HOV) systems in order to increase use of the available capacity, as it was found that HOV lanes were underutilized compared to general purpose lanes. 

Most implementations are currently in the United States. The first practical implementation was California's formerly private toll 91 Express Lanes, in Orange County, California, in 1995, followed in 1996 by Interstate 15 in northern San Diego. According to the Texas A&M Transportation Institute,  there were 294 corridor-miles of HOT/Express lanes in operation in the United States and 163 corridor-miles under construction.

The first HOT lane implementation in Canada was along the Queen Elizabeth Way (QEW) freeway in Ontario. Existing high-occupancy vehicle lanes were redesignated as HOT lanes for a  stretch of the QEW between Oakville and Burlington. The initial system consisted of $180 permits valid for three months, though HOT lanes with electronic tolling infrastructure were announced as part of forthcoming expansions to Ontario Highway 427.

Design

Some systems are reversible, operating in one direction during the morning commute and in the reverse direction during the evening commute. The toll is typically collected using electronic toll collection systems, automatic number plate recognition, or at staffed toll booths. Exempt vehicles typically include those with at least two, three or four occupants, those that use approved alternative fuels, motorcycles, transit vehicles and emergency vehicles. 

The fee, which is displayed prominently at entry points to the lanes, is adjusted in response to demand to regulate the traffic volume and thereby provided a guaranteed minimum traffic speed and level of service.

The Los Angeles Metro ExpressLanes HOT system requires vehicles to be fitted with manually "switchable" transponders where the driver selects the number of occupants, based on which the appropriate fee is charged. California Highway Patrol officers have in-vehicle devices which display the declared occupancy of a vehicle, which they can verify visually and cite any driver(s) with fewer occupants than declared (and tolled for). The new system proved itself to be highly effective in reducing the rate of lane-use violations, with it falling to 40-50% of the violation rates of other comparable California highways, from more than 20-25% (nearly one out of four or five) to just 10% (one in ten). Other transportation officials in California took note of this, subsequently leading to the Bay Area officials of Alameda County to adopt a similar system for the (then) planned Interstate 580.

Funding and construction
Implementation of these systems can be prohibitively expensive, due to the initial construction required—particularly with regard to providing access to and from the express toll lanes at interchanges. However, the long-term benefits—the decrease in delay to able motorists and increased funding for the transportation agency—may outweigh the costs. To offset costs of construction, many transportation agencies lease public roads to a private institution. As a result, construction may be partially or fully funded by the private institution, which receives all of the income from tolling for a specified period.

Criticism

Because HOT lanes and ETLs are often constructed within the existing road space, they are criticized as being an environmental tax or "Lexus lanes" solely beneficial to higher-income individuals, since one toll rate is charged regardless of socioeconomic status and the working poor thus suffer greater financial burden, although some states offer tax deductions or rebates to low income individuals for toll payments. Supporters of HOT lanes counter with the fact that because HOT lanes encourage the use of public transit and ride sharing, they reduce transportation demands and provide a benefit for all. However, HOT lanes have demonstrated no guarantees in eliminating traffic congestion, bringing into question their fundamental usefulness aside from raising funds for private institutions and local governments.

Examples

High Occupancy Toll Lanes (HOT lanes)

Metro ExpressLanes in California
Virginia HOT lanes
Interstate 405 (Washington)
Washington State Route 167
California State Route 237 from Mathilda Avenue to Interstate 880
Interstate 15 in California, various locations
Interstate 580 in California approaching Altamont Pass
Interstate 680 in California, various locations
Interstate 77 in North Carolina near downtown Charlotte
91 Express Lanes in California

Express Toll Lanes (Express lanes)
Northwest Corridor Express Lanes (Interstate 75 and Interstate 575) in Georgia. (No vehicles including HOV 3+ are exempt from the toll.)
South Metro Express Lanes (Interstate 75 and Interstate 675) in Georgia.  (No vehicles including HOV 3+ are exempt from the toll.)
North Tarrant Express in Fort Worth, Texas. Includes Interstate 35W, Interstate 820, State Highway 183, and State Highway 121 (During rush hour, vehicles including HOV 2+ are given a 50% discount)
Interstate 10 Katy Tollway in Houston, Texas (Vehicles including HOV 2+ are only exempt from the toll during rush hour periods)
Interstate 95 in Maryland Between the I-895 merge and just north of MD 43 in White Marsh

See also
Road space rationing
Transportation demand management
List of toll roads in the United States
Feebate

References

External links

Various HOT lane articles on website dedicated to road pricing

 - includes evaluation of 21 HOT lane projects in the U.S.

Electronic toll collection
Intelligent transportation systems
Road congestion charge schemes
Toll (fee)
Road infrastructure